Smith's bent-toed gecko (Hemidactylus malcolmsmithi), also known commonly as Malcolm's bow-fingered gecko,  is a species of lizard in the family Gekkonidae. The species is endemic to  India.

Taxonomy
H. malcolmsmithi was originally described in the genus Gymnodactylus. It is sometimes placed in the genus Cyrtodactylus.

Etymology
The specific name, malcolmsmithi, is in honor of British herpetologist Malcolm Arthur Smith.

Geographic range
H. malcolmsmithi is found in northern India, in the Indian state of Punjab.

The type locality is "Beas River basin, Punjab, India".

Habitat
The preferred natural habitats of H. malcolmsmithi are shrubland and forest.

Description
It has a series of 10–14 femoral pores on the ventral surface of each thigh, the two series being separated by two poreless scales.

Reproduction
H. malcolmsmithi is oviparous.

References

Further reading
Agarwal I, Giri VB, Bauer AM (2018). "On the Status of Cyrtodactylus malcolmsmithi (Constable, 1949)" Breviora (557): 1–11. (Hemidactylus malcolmsmithi, new combination).
Constable, John D. (1949). "Reptiles from the Indian Peninsula in the Museum of Comparative Zoology". Bulletin of the Museum of Comparative Zoology, Cambridge (Massachusetts) 103 (2): 59–160. (Gymnodactylus malcolmsmithi, new species, pp. 80–82).
Underwood, Garth (1954). "On the classification and evolution of geckos". Proceedings of the Zoological Society of London 124 (3): 469–492. (Cyrtodactylus malcolmsmithi, new combination).

Hemidactylus
Reptiles described in 1949
Reptiles of India
Endemic fauna of India